R. L. V Ramakrishnan is an Indian film and television actor and dancer. He is the younger brother of the late actor Kalabhavan Mani.

References

Indian film actors
Indian male dancers